K. Vijayan was an Indian film director. He predominantly worked in Tamil cinema. He mainly worked with Sivaji Ganesan. He directed many Malayalam films as well.

Career
K. Vijayan was an employee of the Golden Rock Railway Workshop in Tiruchirappalli. His first role as lead actor was portraying Paadhai Theriyudhu Paar in 1960. By the end of that decade he started directing, mostly associated with Producer K.Balaji of Sujatha Cine Arts. During the 1970s and until the mid 1980s, he directed many Sivaji Ganesan movies, including Kaaval Dheivam, Punniya Boomi and the 1979 blockbuster Thirisoolam. His other notable movies include Vidhi, Sattam, Viduthalai, a remake of Qurbani and Vandichakkaram. He died in 1988 during the filming of En Rathathin Rathame, which was eventually completed by his son Sundar K. Vijayan

His assistants included Samuthirakani and K. S. Adhiyaman.

Partial filmography

As director

References

External links 
 

Malayalam film directors
Tamil film directors
Place of birth missing
1939 births
20th-century Indian film directors
Artists from Tiruchirappalli
Kannada film directors
Hindi-language film directors
Film directors from Tamil Nadu
1988 deaths